The Chameleon oil pattern is a pattern of oil used by the Professional Bowlers Association in tournament play. It is among the numerous Animal Patterns.

The current rendition of the Chameleon pattern is 39 feet in length. This forces players to play a specific part of the lane because of the way the oil is layered in "strips". The lane conditions dictate where the bowler should play. This is considered a "retro" approach to pattern designing.

The Chameleon pattern varies in a large range of scores (low to high), as does the bowlers' approach to the pattern. There isn't one specific bowling style that is most effective on this pattern, because there can be multiple target lines that dictate how much the ball will hook, and thus how much curvature its path will have.

This oil pattern is named after the chameleon because like a chameleon, which can change its color repeatedly, so too must a bowler be able to change his style of play.

Tournaments that used this pattern

References

External links
Chameleon Oil Pattern by Jef Goodger at about.com
PBA Oil Patterns: Chameleon

Ten-pin bowling